Brittany Louise Lauga (née McKee; born 19 June 1986) is an Australian politician and town planner. She has been the Labor member for Keppel in the Queensland Legislative Assembly since 2015.

Early life, education and non-political career 
Lauga grew up in Central Queensland, Australia, where her current residence is at the suburb of Parkhurst, in the Electoral District of Keppel.

For high school Lauga went to Rockhampton Grammar School where she graduated in 2003. She went on to study a dual Bachelor of Laws/Bachelor of Justice at Queensland University of Technology (QUT) in Brisbane partially for two years, then moving onto a Bachelor of Urban Development and graduating with honours. While Lauga was studying her Bachelor of Urban Development she was a founding member of the QUT Planning Students Association and a General Secretary of the QUT Student Guild. Lauga later commenced a Master of Business Administration (MBA) at CQUniversity in Rockhampton.

After graduating as a town planner, Lauga went to work for Craven Ovenden Town Planning as a student town planner. After leaving Craven Ovenden Town Planning, Lauga went on and worked for the Department of Housing and Public Works within Project Services involving the planning and project management of social housing. Lauga then went on to work for Central Queensland consulting firm, CQG Consulting.

Personal life
In April 2017, Lauga announced that she was expecting her first child. She gave birth to a daughter in October.

References

1986 births
Living people
Members of the Queensland Legislative Assembly
Queensland University of Technology alumni
People from Rockhampton
Australian Labor Party members of the Parliament of Queensland
21st-century Australian politicians
Women members of the Queensland Legislative Assembly
21st-century Australian women politicians